Thomas Malcolm Murchison (October 8, 1896 – October 20, 1962) was a Major League Baseball pitcher who played for two seasons. He pitched for the St. Louis Cardinals in 1917 and the Cleveland Indians in 1920.

External links

1896 births
1962 deaths
Major League Baseball pitchers
St. Louis Cardinals players
Cleveland Indians players
Chicago Cubs scouts
San Francisco Giants scouts
Baseball players from North Carolina
Guilford Quakers baseball players
Minor league baseball managers
Laurel Lumberjacks players